The following is a list of programs broadcast currently or formerly on Fox Sports 1, and occasionally on sister network Fox Sports 2.

Currently broadcast by Fox Sports 1

News / analysis programming

The Herd with Colin Cowherd (since 2015)
NASCAR RaceDay (since 2013)
NASCAR Race Hub (since 2013)
NASCAR Victory Lane (since 2013)
Skip and Shannon: Undisputed (since 2016)
Speak for Yourself (talk show) (since 2016)
UFC Tonight (since 2013)

Event coverage

Baseball
 Major League Baseball (2014–present)
 40 regular season MLB games (mostly on Saturdays)
 Up to 15 post-season games (8 Divisional Series games and 1 best-of-seven League Championship Series)

Basketball
 BIG3 (2017–present)
 8 regular season weeks totaling 32 games
 Playoffs

Boxing
 Premier Boxing Champions (2015–present)

College athletics
 NCAA football and basketball (2013–present)
 Big East men's and women's basketball (2013–present)
 Big 12 football and women's basketball (2013–present)
 Pac-12 football and men's and women's basketball (2013–present)
 Big Ten Conference (2017–present)
 Holiday Bowl (2017–present)

Futsal
 FIFA Futsal World Cup (exclusive coverage of the 2016, 2020 and 2024 FIFA Futsal World Cup)

Golf
 USGA Championships (2015–present)
 U.S. Open (2015–present; live coverage of the first two rounds)
 U.S. Senior Open (2015–present; live coverage of the first two rounds)
 Men's, Women's and Junior Amateur Championships (2015–present)
 Men's and Women's Four-Ball Championships (2015–present)
 Franklin Templeton Shootout (2015–present; live coverage of the first two rounds)

Horse racing
 Up to 10 graded stakes races (2014–present)
 2 top stakes races (2014–present)

Mixed martial arts
 Ultimate Fighting Championship (2013–present)
 Approximately 18 live UFC events, primarily on Saturday nights (more rarely on Wednesdays and Sundays)
 Live preliminary fights for UFC pay-per-view events on Saturday nights
 The Ultimate Fighter reality television series and tournament, two seasons per year 

Motorsports
 AMA Supercross Championship (2013–present)
 Coverage of the Monster Energy AMA Supercross Championship across FS1 and FS2 (2013–2018)
 Coverage of the AMSOIL AMA Arenacross Championship across FS1 and FS2 (2013–present)
 Coverage of the Monster Energy Cup event (2013–present)
 ARCA Racing Series presented by Menards (ten live ARCA races across FS1 and FS2)
 FIA Formula E Championship (2014–present; coverage across Fox, FS1 and FS2)
 FIA World Endurance Championship (2013–2017)
 24 Hours of LeMans (2013–2017; coverage across FS1 and FS2)
 IMSA (2013–2018)
 TUDOR United SportsCar Championship (2013–present; coverage of the entire season across FS1 and FS2)
 Continental Tire Sports Car Challenge (2013–2018 coverage of the entire season across FS1 and FS2)
 Monster Jam (2013–2018; coverage across FS1 and FS2)
 NASCAR (2013–present)
 Monster Energy NASCAR Cup Series (2015–present; live coverage of 6 races, as well as practice and qualifying events for the first 17 Cup races)
 NASCAR All-Star Race (2014–present)
 Xfinity Series (2015-presebt; live coverage of 10 races, as well as practice and qualifying for the first 14 Xfinity Series races)
 Camping World Truck Series (2013–present; live coverage rights to all races including practice and qualifying races, with exception of the Fred's 250, which airs on FOX)
 National Hot Rod Association (2016–present)
 NHRA Mello Yello Drag Racing Series; coverage of Friday and Saturday qualifying, and Sunday eliminations
 NHRA Lucas Oil Drag Racing Series; Select Sportsman eliminations
 NHRA J&A Service Pro Mod Drag Racing Series

Soccer
 CONCACAF (2013–present)
 CONCACAF Gold Cup (2014–present; select matches broadcast across FS1, FS2 and Fox Soccer Plus)
 CONCACAF Champions League (2014–present; select matches broadcast across FS1, FS2 and Fox Soccer Plus)
 CONMEBOL (2013–present)
 Copa Libertadores (2014–present; select tournament matches)
 Copa América Centenario (2016)
 FA Cup (2014–present; select tournament matches)
 FIFA World Cup (exclusive coverage of the 2018, 2022, and 2026 FIFA World Cup)
 FIFA Women's World Cup (exclusive coverage of the 2015, 2019, and 2023 FIFA Women's World Cup)
 German Bundesliga (2015–present; all 306 league games via FS1, FS2 and Fox Soccer Plus)
 DFL-Supercup (2015–present)
 Bundesliga relegation playoffs (2015–present)
 Major League Soccer (2015–present; 34 regular season matches)
 MLS All-Star Game (2015–present; rights alternating with ESPN)
 MLS Cup (beginning in 2015; rights alternating with ESPN)
 UEFA (2013–present)
 UEFA Champions League (2015–present; 146 league games across FS1, FS2 and Fox Soccer Plus; 2 live matches per week on FS1)
 UEFA Europa League (2015–present; 205 league games across FS1, FS2 and Fox Soccer Plus; 2 live matches per week on FS1)
 U.S. Men's National Soccer Team (2015–present; rights to all matches shared with ESPN)

Formerly broadcast by Fox Sports 1

News/analysis programming
America's Pregame (2014-2015)
Fox NFL Kickoff (2013-2015)
Fox Sports Live (2013-2017)
Garbage Time with Katie Nolan (2015-2017)
The Mike Francesa Show (2014-2015)

See also 

 Fox Sports
 Fox Sports 1
 Fox Sports 2

References

Sports television in the United States